Arnaldo Deserti (born 1 April 1979) is an Italian water polo player.

Born at Genoa, he currently plays for Rari Nantes Bogliasco and the Italian water polo national team.

He won the gold medal at the 2011 FINA World Aquatics Championships in Shanghai.

See also
 List of world champions in men's water polo
 List of World Aquatics Championships medalists in water polo

External links
 

1979 births
Living people
Water polo players from Genoa
Italian male water polo players
World Aquatics Championships medalists in water polo
21st-century Italian people